Finale is the second live double album (and eighth overall release) by singer-songwriter duo Loggins and Messina, released in early 1977. Tracks on the album are from performances while touring in 1975 and 1976.

The duo had parted by the time this album was released, and it was considered by some purely as a profit-taking move intended to see what money could be made before the pair faded from the public mind and in that light it can be considered a Columbia 'corporate' release, rather than one intended by artists Kenny Loggins or Jim Messina.

This was the last album by Kenny Loggins shortly before his first solo album, Celebrate Me Home, was released April 1977.

Track listing

Disc one

Side One
"Introduction" – 1:42
"Travelin' Blues" (Jim Messina) – 3:07
"Medley:" – 6:34
Danny's Song (Kenny Loggins)
A Love Song (Loggins, Donna Lyn George)
House at Pooh Corner (Loggins)
Thinking of You (Messina)
"Keep Me in Mind" (Messina) – 4:04
"Pretty Princess" (Messina, Murray MacLeod) – 6:40

Side Two
"Brighter Days" (Loggins, Donna Lyn George) – 3:39
"Be Free" (Messina) – 7:06
"Peacemaker" (Loggins, John Townsend, Ed Sanford) – 5:00
"Growin'" (Loggins, Ronnie Wilkins) – 2:43

Disc two

Side Three
"Motel Cowboy" (Loggins, Messina) – 2:57
"Country Medley:" – 7:26
Listen to a Country Song (Messina, Al Garth)
Oh Lonesome Me (Don Gibson)
I'm Movin' On (Hank Snow)
Listen to a Country Song (Reprise)"
"Oklahoma, Home of Mine" (Loggins, Messina) – 3:16
"Changes" (Messina) – 4:29

Side Four
"You Need a Man" (Messina) – 9:20
"Lately My Love" (Messina) – 3:37
"Rock & Roll Medley:" – 5:42
My Music (Loggins, Messina)
Splish Splash (Bobby Darin, Jean Murray)
Boogie Man (Messina)

Personnel
Kenny Loggins – vocals, rhythm guitar, acoustic guitar, harmonica
Jim Messina – vocals, lead guitar, acoustic guitar, mandolin
Merel Bregante – drums
Jon Clarke – saxophone, flute, oboe
Vince Denham – saxophone
Steve Forman – percussion
Richard Greene – violin
George Hawkins – bass guitar and backing vocals on "Pretty Princess"
Jack Lenz – flute, keyboards
Doug Livingston – keyboards on "Pretty Princess"
Willy Ornelas – drums on "Pretty Princess"
Woody Paul – rhythm guitar on "Pretty Princess"
Don Roberts – saxophone
Larry Sims – bass guitar, vocals

Charts
Album – Billboard (United States)

References

Loggins and Messina albums
1977 live albums
Albums produced by Jim Messina (musician)
Columbia Records live albums